Riboviria is a realm of viruses that includes all viruses that use a homologous RNA-dependent polymerase for replication. It includes RNA viruses that encode an RNA-dependent RNA polymerase, as well as reverse-transcribing viruses (with either RNA or DNA genomes) that encode an RNA-dependent DNA polymerase. RNA-dependent RNA polymerase (RdRp), also called RNA replicase, produces RNA (ribonucleic acid) from RNA. RNA-dependent DNA polymerase (RdDp), also called reverse transcriptase (RT), produces DNA (deoxyribonucleic acid) from RNA. These enzymes are essential for replicating the viral genome and transcribing viral genes into messenger RNA (mRNA) for translation of viral proteins.

Riboviria was established in 2018 to accommodate all RdRp-encoding RNA viruses and was expanded a year later to also include RdDp-encoding retroviruses. These two groups of viruses are assigned to two separate kingdoms: Orthornavirae for RdRp-encoding RNA viruses, and Pararnavirae for RdDp-encoding viruses, i.e. all reverse-transcribing viruses. While the realm has few prokaryotic viruses, it includes most eukaryotic viruses, including most human, animal, and plant viruses, however, metagenomic studies are changing this perspective.

Many of the most widely known viral diseases are caused by viruses in Riboviria, which includes coronaviruses, ebola virus, HIV, influenza viruses, and the rabies virus. These viruses and others have been prominent throughout history, including Tobacco mosaic virus, which was the first virus to be discovered. Many reverse transcribing viruses notably become integrated into the genome of their host as part of their replication cycle. As a result of that, it is estimated that about 7–8% of the human genome originates from these viruses.

Etymology
Riboviria is a portmanteau of ribo, referencing ribonucleic acid, and the suffix -viria, which is the suffix used for virus realms.

Characteristics

All members of Riboviria contain a gene that encodes for an RNA-dependent polymerase, also called RNA-directed polymerase. There are two types of RNA-dependent polymerases: RNA-dependent RNA polymerase (RdRp), also called RNA replicase, which synthesizes RNA from RNA, and RNA-dependent DNA polymerase (RdDp), also called reverse transcriptase (RT), which synthesizes DNA from RNA. In a typical virus particle, called a virion, the RNA-dependent polymerase is bound to the viral genome in some manner and begins transcription of the viral genome after entering a cell. As part of a virus's life cycle, the RNA-dependent polymerase also synthesizes copies of the viral genome as part of the process of creating new viruses.

Viruses that replicate via RdRp belong to three groups in the Baltimore classification system, all of which are in the kingdom Orthornavirae: single-stranded RNA (ssRNA) viruses, which are either positive (+) or negative (-) sense, and double-stranded RNA viruses (dsRNA). +ssRNA viruses have genomes that can functionally act as mRNA, and a negative sense strand can also be created to form dsRNA from which mRNA is transcribed from the negative strand. The genomes of -ssRNA viruses and dsRNA viruses act as templates from which RdRp creates mRNA.

Viruses that replicate via reverse transcription belong to two Baltimore groups, both of which are in the kingdom Pararnavirae: single-stranded RNA (ssRNA-RT) viruses, all of which belong to the order Ortervirales, and double-stranded DNA (dsDNA-RT) viruses, which belong to the family Caulimoviridae, also in Ortervirales, and the family Hepadnaviridae of the order Blubervirales. ssRNA-RT viruses have their positive-sense genome transcribed by RdDp to synthesize a negative sense complementary DNA (-cDNA) strand. The +RNA strand is degraded and later replaced by RdDp with a +DNA strand to synthesize a linear dsDNA copy of the viral genome. This genome is then integrated into the host cell's DNA.

For dsDNA-RT viruses, a pregenomic +RNA strand is transcribed from the relaxed circular DNA (rcDNA), which is in turn used by RdDp to transcribe a -cDNA strand. The +RNA strand is degraded and replaced in a similar manner as +ssRNA-RT viruses to synthesize the rcDNA. The rcDNA genome is later repaired by the host cell's DNA repair mechanisms to synthesize a covalently closed circular DNA (cccDNA) genome. The integrated genome of +ssRNA-RT viruses and the cccDNA of dsDNA-RT viruses are then transcribed into mRNA by the host cell enzyme RNA polymerase II.

Viral mRNA is translated by the host cell's ribosomes to produce viral proteins. In order to produce more viruses, viral RNA-dependent polymerases use copies of the viral genome as templates to replicate the viral genome. For +ssRNA viruses, an intermediate dsRNA genome is created from which +ssRNA is synthesized from the negative strand. For -ssRNA viruses, genomes are synthesized from complementary positive sense strands. dsRNA viruses replicate their genomes from mRNA by synthesizing a complementary negative sense strand to form genomic dsRNA. For dsDNA-RT viruses, pregenomic RNA created from the cccDNA is retrotranscribed into new dsDNA genomes. For +ssRNA-RT viruses, the genome is replicated from the integrated genome. After replication and translation, the genome and the viral proteins are assembled into complete virions, which then leave the host cell.

Phylogenetics

Both kingdoms in Riboviria show a relation to the reverse transcriptases of group II introns that encode RTs and retrotransposons, which are self-replicating DNA sequences, the latter of which self-replicate via reverse transcription and integrate themselves into other parts of the same DNA molecule. Reverse transcribing viruses, assigned to Pararnavirae, appear to have evolved from a retrotransposon on a single occasion. The origin of the RdRps of Orthornavirae is less clear due to a lack of information, that they originate from a reverse transcriptase from bacterial group II intron before the emergence of eukaryotes or originated before the last universal common ancestor (LUCA) being descendants of the ancient RNA world and that they preceded the retroelement reverse transcriptases. A larger study (2022) where new lieneages (phyla) were described, was in favor of the hypothesis that RNA viruses descend from the RNA world, suggesting that retroelements originated from an ancestor related to the phylum Lenarviricota and that members of a newly discovered Taraviricota lineage (phylum) would be the ancestors of all RNA viruses.

Classification
Riboviria contains two kingdoms: Orthornavirae and Pararnavirae. Orthornavirae contains multiple phyla and unassigned taxa, whereas Pararnavirae is monotypic down to the rank of class. This taxonomy can be visualized hereafter.

 Kingdom: Orthornavirae, which contains all RdRp-encoding RNA viruses, i.e. all dsRNA, +ssRNA, and -ssRNA viruses, often collectively called RNA viruses
 Kingdom: Pararnavirae, which contains all RdDp-encoding viruses, i.e. all ssRNA-RT and dsDNA-RT viruses, collectively called reverse transcribing viruses
 Phylum: Arterviricota
 Class: Revtraviricetes

Additionally, Riboviria contains two incertae sedis families and four incertae sedis genera. Additional information about them is needed to know their exact placement in higher taxa. They are listed hereafter (-viridae indicates family and -virus indicates genus).

 Polymycoviridae
 Sarthroviridae
 Albetovirus
 Aumaivirus
 Papanivirus
 Virtovirus

Metagenomic studies have suggested the existence of five new phyla: Arctiviricota, Taraviricota, Pomiviricota, Paraxenoviricota and Wamoviricota.

Riboviria partially merges Baltimore classification with virus taxonomy, including the Baltimore groups for RNA viruses and reverse transcribing viruses in the realm. Baltimore classification is a classification system used for viruses based on their manner of mRNA production, often used alongside standard virus taxonomy, which is based on evolutionary history. All members of five Baltimore groups belong to Riboviria: Group III: dsRNA viruses, Group IV: +ssRNA viruses, Group V: -ssRNA viruses, Group VI: ssRNA-RT viruses, and Group VII: dsDNA-RT viruses. Realms are the highest level of taxonomy used for viruses and Riboviria is one of four, the other three being Duplodnaviria, Monodnaviria, and Varidnaviria.

Most identified eukaryotic viruses are RNA viruses, and for that reason most eukaryotic viruses belong to Riboviria, including most human, animal, and plant viruses. In contrast, only two groups of prokaryotic RNA viruses have been identified: +ssRNA Leviviricetes, which appear to be some of the first RNA viruses to emerge and dsRNA Cystoviridae, which appears to be related to reoviruses, which infect eukaryotes. Studies of megenomic samples have uncovered new prokaryotic RNA virus taxa including two new phyla that infect only prokaryotes, suggesting that their diversity is greater than previously thought and challenging the traditional view that RNA viruses only infect mostly eukaryotes. They also suggest that families Picobirnaviridae and Partitiviridae previously associated with eukaryotes also infect prokaryotes.

Other major branches of eukaryotic viruses include herpesviruses in Duplodnaviria, the kingdom Shotokuvirae in Monodnaviria, and many viruses in Varidnaviria.

Interactions with hosts

Disease
Viruses in Riboviria are associated with a wide range of diseases, including many of the most widely known viral diseases. Notable disease-causing viruses in the realm include:

 coronaviruses
 Crimean-Congo hemorrhagic fever orthonairovirus
 Dengue virus
 Ebolavirus
 hantaviruses
 Hepatitis B virus
 the human immunodeficiency viruses
 Human orthopneumovirus
 influenza viruses
 Japanese encephalitis virus
 Lassa mammarenavirus
 Measles morbillivirus
 Mumps orthorubulavirus
 Norovirus
 Poliovirus
 Rabies lyssavirus
 Rhinoviruses
 Rift Valley fever phlebovirus
 Rotavirus
 Rubella virus
 Tick-borne encephalitis virus
 West Nile virus
 Yellow fever virus
 Zika virus

Animal viruses in Riboviria include orbiviruses, which cause various diseases in ruminants and horses, including Bluetongue virus, African horse sickness virus, Equine encephalosis virus, and epizootic hemorrhagic disease virus. The vesicular stomatitis virus causes disease in cattle, horses, and pigs. Bats harbor many viruses including ebolaviruses and henipaviruses, which also can cause disease in humans. Similarly, arthropod viruses in the Flavivirus and Phlebovirus genera are numerous and often transmitted to humans. Coronaviruses and influenza viruses cause disease in various vertebrates, including bats, birds, and pigs. The family Retroviridae contains many viruses that cause leukemia, immunodeficiency, and other cancers and immune system-related diseases in animals.

Plant viruses in the realm are numerous and infect many economically important crops. Tomato spotted wilt virus is estimated to cause more than 1 billion USD in damages annually, affecting more than 800 plant species including chrysanthemum, lettuce, peanut, pepper, and tomato. Cucumber mosaic virus infects more than 1,200 plant species and likewise causes significant crop losses. Potato virus Y causes significant reductions in yield and quality for pepper, potato, tobacco, and tomato, and Plum pox virus is the most important virus among stone fruit crops. Brome mosaic virus, while not causing significant economic losses, is found throughout much of the world and primarily infects grasses, including cereals.

Endogenization
Many reverse transcribing viruses, called retroviruses, in Riboviria are able to become integrated into the DNA of their host. These viruses become endogenized as part of their replication cycle. Namely, the viral genome is integrated into the host genome by the retroviral enzyme integrase, and viral mRNA is produced from that DNA. Endogenization is a form of horizontal gene transfer between unrelated organisms, and it is estimated that about 7–8% of the human genome consists of retroviral DNA. Endogenization can also be used to study the evolutionary history of viruses, showing an approximate time period when a virus first became endogenized into the host's genome as well as the rate of evolution for the viruses since endogenization first occurred.

History
Diseases caused by viruses in Riboviria have been known for much of recorded history, though their cause was only discovered in modern times. Tobacco mosaic virus was discovered in 1898 and was the first virus to be discovered. Viruses transmitted by arthropods have been central in the development of vector control, which often aims to prevent viral infections. In modern history, numerous disease outbreaks have been caused by various members of the realm, including coronaviruses, ebola, and influenza. HIV especially has had dramatic effects on society as it causes a sharp decline in life expectancy and significant stigma for infected persons.

For a long time, the relation between many viruses in Riboviria could not be established due to the high amount of genetic divergence among RNA viruses. With the development of viral metagenomics, many additional RNA viruses were identified, helping to fill in the gaps of their relations. This led to the establishment of Riboviria in 2018 to accommodate all RdRp-encoding RNA viruses based on phylogenetic analysis that they were related.

A year later, all reverse transcribing viruses were added to the realm. The kingdoms were also established in 2019, separating the two RNA-dependent polymerase branches. When the realm was founded, it mistakenly included two viroid families, Avsunviroidae and Pospiviroidae, and the genus Deltavirus, which were promptly removed in 2019 because they use host cell enzymes for replication.

See also

 List of higher virus taxa

References

Further reading
 

 
Virus realms